Indian Institute of Mass Communication (IIMC) is an Indian media centre of learning and civil service training institute for the Indian Information Service Cadre funded and promoted by the Government of India in New Delhi. The IIMC is an autonomous society under the Ministry of Information and Broadcasting. The then Minister in charge of Information and Broadcasting, Indira Gandhi formally inaugurated the institute on 17 August 1965.

Institutes 
The institute has headquarters in New Delhi and five regional campuses at Aizawl (Mizoram), Amravati (Maharashtra), Dhenkanal (Odisha), Jammu (J&K), and Kottayam (Kerala).

Academics
IIMC teaches a variety of disciplines including print journalism, photo journalism, radio journalism, television journalism, English journalism, Hindi journalism, Urdu journalism, development communication, communication research, advertising and public relations, Digital media.

Admission to these courses is through an All India Entrance Examination followed by group discussions and interviews.

It also offers Diploma Course in Development Journalism for non-aligned and developing countries. The institute was basically set up to provide training to the officers of the Indian Information Service. The institute also conducts each year a number of specialised short-term courses to meet the training needs of media personnel working in government and public sector organisations.

Notable alumni

 Aishwarya Rutuparna Pradhan, India's first openly transgender civil servant.
 Anshu Gupta, Social Worker, and founder of Goonj (NGO)
 Arun Krishnamurthy, Social Worker, and founder of Environmentalist Foundation of India
 Chitra Subramaniam, known for breaking the infamous Bofors scandal
 David Devadas, journalist, writer and columnist
 Deepak Chaurasia, Editor-in-chief India News
 Sudhir Chaudhary, Editor in chief, Zee News
 Hasleen Kaur, Actress, model and Miss India Earth 2011
 Neelesh Misra, author, journalist and Bollywood lyricist
 Nidhi Razdan, anchor of NDTV 24x7
 Niret Alva, TV producer, co-founder Miditech
 Rini Simon Khanna, news anchor
 Ravish Kumar, senior executive editor in NDTV India
 Mandeep Punia, Freelance Journalist
 Satyendra Murli, Media Pedagogue, Researcher, and Journalist; Assistant Professor at University of Delhi.
 Sonal Kalra, Editor, HT City
 Sourav Mishra, journalist, livelihood interventionist, researcher
 Sunetra Choudhury, journalist, and anchor of NDTV 24x7
 Vartika Nanda, Head of the Department of Journalism at Lady Shri Ram College for Women
 Vivek Agnihotri, Indian film director
 Željko Malnar, Croatian maverick traveler, writer and TV producer
 Zafar Anjum, Writer, journalist, publisher and filmmaker
 Rahul Roushan, Satirist, Social and Political Commentator, Founder of Faking News and Opindia.com
 Vishakha Singh, Bollywood Actor
Sheikh Noorul Hassan, Member of the Legislative Assembly (India)

Alumni Association 
IIMC Alumni Association (IIMCAA) meets every year at their annual event Connections. Held at various cities across India and worldwide in Chapters, alumni regularly meet and network.

References

1965 establishments in Delhi
Educational institutions established in 1965
Education in Delhi
Universities and colleges in Delhi
Journalism schools in India
Ministry of Information and Broadcasting (India)